Nestor Alberto Asprilla Murillo (born 28 January 1986) is a Colombian professional footballer.

References

1986 births
Living people
Colombian footballers
Girardot F.C. footballers
Tigres F.C. footballers
Atlético Juventud footballers
Atlético Huila footballers
FBC Melgar footballers
Fortaleza C.E.I.F. footballers
Unión Deportivo Universitario players
C.D. Atlético Marte footballers
Colombian expatriate footballers
Expatriate footballers in Peru
Expatriate footballers in El Salvador
Association football defenders
People from Palmira, Valle del Cauca
Sportspeople from Valle del Cauca Department